Wandering star may refer to:
An archaic or poetic term for a classical planet
"Wandering Star", a song by Portishead from their 1994 album Dummy
"Wandering Star", a song by Lisa Gerrard from her 2006 album The Silver Tree
"Wand'rin' Star", a song from the 1951 Broadway musical comedy Paint Your Wagon, which was a UK number one single for Lee Marvin in 1970
"Wandering Star", a song by Kid Beyond from his 2006 album Amplivate
"Wandering Star", a song by Empire Of The Sun from 2014 written for the film Dumb and Dumber To
Wandering Stars, a 1974 anthology of Jewish science fiction and fantasy edited by Jack Dann
Wandering Star: A Novel (Étoile errante), a novel by French author J. M. G. Le Clézio
Wandering Stars, a reference to false teachers which were misleading Christians in Jude 1:13 of most modern English translations of the Bible;
Wandering Stars, the series of paintings by Russian artist Igor Kalinauskas (2005)

See also
Shooting star (disambiguation)